Cladonia macrophyllodes, commonly known as the large-leaved cladonia or the large-leaved cup lichen, is a species of cup lichen in the family Cladoniaceae.

See also
List of Cladonia species

References

Lichens described in 1875
macrophyllodes
Lichen species
Taxa named by William Nylander (botanist)